Mark Anthony Stock (born April 27, 1966) is a former American football wide receiver in the National Football League (NFL) for the Pittsburgh Steelers, the Washington Redskins, and the Indianapolis Colts.  He also spent a year in the World League of American Football (WLAF) with the World Champions Sacramento Surge and a year in the Canadian Football League (CFL) with the San Antonio Texans. He was a 1988 graduate of Virginia Military Institute and a commissioned officer with the U.S. Army where he spent time on active duty during Operation Desert Storm.  

Currently Stock is an Owner and Realtor at Mark Stock Real Estate Experts with RE/MAX in Northern Virginia.

External links
 Northern Virginia Realtor

American football wide receivers
Players of American football from Canton, Ohio
1966 births
Living people
Indianapolis Colts players
Pittsburgh Steelers players
Sacramento Surge players
San Antonio Texans players
VMI Keydets football players
Washington Redskins players